Theo Timmermans (born 15 September 1989) is a Dutch professional footballer who currently plays as a goalkeeper for SV Spakenburg. He formerly played professional football for SC Veendam and FC Volendam.

External links
 Voetbal International profile 
 

1989 births
Living people
Dutch footballers
SC Veendam players
FC Volendam players
Eerste Divisie players
People from Opsterland
Association football goalkeepers
VV Sneek Wit Zwart players
Harkemase Boys players
Footballers from Friesland
SV Spakenburg players